4B may refer to :
 4B (movement), South Korean radical feminist movement
 "4B" (song), a song by Terminaator from Minu väike paradiis
4B, the production code for the 1975 Doctor Who serial The Sontaran Experiment

See also
 Long March 4B, a Chinese orbital carrier rocket
 Oflag IV-B Koenigstein, a German prisoner of war camp
 Stalag IV-B, a German prisoner of war camp
B4 (disambiguation)